Hans Theler was a Swiss bobsledder who competed in the mid-1950s. He won a gold medal in the four-man event at the 1957 FIBT World Championships in St. Moritz.

References
Bobsleigh four-man world championship medalists since 1930

Possibly living people
Swiss male bobsledders
Year of birth missing
20th-century Swiss people